Bjarkalundur, one of the regions of Iceland, is located in the southeastern part of Westfjords, Iceland. The area contains the oldest summer hotel in Iceland, built in 1945-1947. A few kilometers from Bjarkalundur is the village of Reykhólar.

References

Westfjords